Jason Siʻi (born December 27, 1983) is an American Samoan soccer midfielder. Born in the United States, he is an American Samoa international.

Early life

Moving to Oregon at an early age, Siʻi began playing soccer at second grade despite having an antipathy for the sport. Committing to varsity soccer at East Linn Christian Academy and Corban University both in Oregon, he is an inhabitant of Lebanon, Oregon playing in the Willamette Valley Soccer League with Team Puebla Oregon.

He is an American Samoa international.

He played college soccer in the United States.

International

His heritage is from American Samoa, so he decided to play for them.

References

1983 births
Living people
American Samoan footballers
American men's soccer players
Soccer players from California
American Samoa international footballers
Soccer players from Oregon
Association football midfielders